Miller Homestead is a historic home located at Au Sable in Clinton County, New York.  The house was built in 1822 and is a -story stone dwelling.  It is a five-by-two-bay, side-gabled Federal-style structure.  Also on the property is the foundation remains of a large 19th-century barn and a stone wall. It is open as a local history museum.

It was listed on the National Register of Historic Places in 1999.

References

Houses on the National Register of Historic Places in New York (state)
Federal architecture in New York (state)
1820s architecture in the United States
Houses in Clinton County, New York
National Register of Historic Places in Clinton County, New York